Tamsin "Tammy" Sear (born 22 January 1977) is a British former competitive figure skater.

Sear is the first British female figure skater to land a triple lutz (completed at the 1998 British Championships) and the first to land a triple-triple jump combination at an Ondrej Nepela event.

Sear began skating in 1986 at the Oxford ice rink. Her coaches included Tony Barron, Rafael Arutyunyan, Evelyn Kramer, and Frank Carroll.

She is the 2000 British national champion in ladies' singles and was part of the British team sent to the 2000 European Championships in Vienna, Austria.  She advanced to the free skate in that competition and placed 23rd. Sear also competed in the subsequent 2000_World_Figure_Skating_Championships in Nice, France, where she failed to qualify to the short program.

After retiring from competitive skating, Sear continued to perform in professional shows around the world as a principal soloist.

Sear coaches in the UK as Tamsin Sear-Watkins and is a UK Skating Level 3 performance coach and choreographer. She is married with two children.  Sear coaches her daughter Arabella Sear-Watkins, who won the 2019 British Advanced Novice championship title and who has competed internationally in the 2021-22 and 2022–23_ISU_Junior_Grand_Prix series.

Competitive highlights

References

External links
 

1977 births
British female single skaters
Living people
Sportspeople from Oxford